Rachel Khanna (née Newman; born January 29, 1972) is an American marketing executive and politician. She currently serves as a member of the Connecticut House of Representatives for the 149th District, which encompasses parts of Greenwich and Stamford,for the Democratic Party since 2023. She defeated incumbent Republican Kimberly Fiorello. 

Before being elected to office she was worked in marketing at Morgan Stanley Asset Management after working in market research at Euromonitor International. Since 2019, Khanna also served District 10 (which encompasses the Backcountry section of town) on the Greenwich RTM.

Early life and education 
Khanna was born January 29, 1972 in Cannes, Cote d'Azur, France to American parents. She attended high school there and returned to the United States to attend college. She graduated with a Bachelor of Artsfrom Bryn Mawr College in 1993 and received additional education at Columbia University in 1994, where she completed a Master's degree in Political Science.

Career 
Khanna worked for Morgan Stanley and Euromonitor International before entering politics. In 2007, Khanna started an organic meal delivery service based in Banksville and serving Greenwich and Stamford and also published two cookbooks. She is currently also on the board of trustees of the Jaideep and Rachel Khanna Foundation, a Greenwich non-profit organization. 

Since 2019, she also served on the Representative Town Meeting (RTM) in Greenwich, for District 10.

Connecticut House of Representatives

Elections

2022 
In 2022, she was elected as the representative from the 149th district in the Connecticut House of Representatives for the Democratic Party￼ defeating Republican Incumbent Kimberly Fiorello.

Tenure 
She currently serves on the Appropriations Committee, Government Administration & Elections Committee as well as the Transportation Committe.

Electoral History

Personal Life 
In 1994, she married Indian-born banker and financier Jaideep Chand Khanna (b. 1963), in Manhattan, New York. They were introduced while working at Morgan Stanley in New York.

They have four daughters and reside in Greenwich, Connecticut.

References 

Members of the Connecticut General Assembly